Campsmount Academy is a coeducational secondary school and sixth form located in Norton, South Yorkshire, England.

Originally known as Campsmount School, the school gained specialist status as a Technology College and was renamed Campsmount Technology College. The school was gutted by a major fire in December 2009, and temporary classrooms were erected on the site. A rebuild of the school was completed in April 2012, and a month later the school converted to academy status and was renamed Campsmount Academy.

Campsmount Academy offers GCSEs and Cambridge Nationals as programmes of study for pupils, while students in the sixth form have the option to study a range of A-levels, BTECs and Cambridge Technicals.

References

External links
Campsmount Academy official website

Secondary schools in Doncaster
Academies in Doncaster
Norton, Doncaster